Ivan Goran Kovačić (21 March 1913 – 12 July 1943) was a Croatian poet and writer.

Early life and background
He was born in Lukovdol (part of Vrbovsko), a town in Gorski Kotar, to a Croat father, Ivan Kovačić, and Transylvanian Jewish mother Ruža (née Klein).

He attended the Gymnasium Karlovac. In his honour, the Karlovac city library, the city's oldest cultural institution founded in 1838, was renamed after him.

During World War II, in the harsh winter of 1942, Kovačić and Vladimir Nazor volunteered for the Partisan forces to set an anti-fascist example for the world. At that time, Goran was already ill with tuberculosis and Nazor was advanced in age, but they were motivated by their consciences. Kovačić was killed by Serbian Chetnik troops in an east-Bosnian village of Vrbica near Foča on 13 July 1943.

His death is described as follows: “Like in an ancient tragedy, the one who is most opposed to evil will most cruelly die from evil. The poet who raised his voice against the Croatian Ustaše massive killing and torturing of Serbian civilians (women and children mostly) had his throat cut by Serbian Chetniks….A few reliable witnesses confirm that Goran survived the hell of the fifth offensive, but when he returned to help his ill, left-behind, friend, Dr Simo Milošević, the fascists killed both the Croatian poet and the Serbian scholar without distinction. Fascism did not look on poets or scientists anywhere in the world as being of value.”

Works

Death is a central theme in much of Kovačić's poetry, however this is not a reflection on his life outlook. His melancholy subjects came from outside events—such as his own and his brother's affliction with tuberculosis—rather than from an internal disposition toward the morose. Jure Kaštelan, one of Kovačić's contemporaries, expressed that Kovačić was inclined both toward romanticism and realism in his poetry, and that Kovačić had an intense perception of life.

His best known work is "Jama" ("The Pit"). He penned it during the war, while in service near the town of Livno. The poem was written out of intellectual and ethical responsibility that condemns atrocities and massacres done by the Croatian Ustaše. It has been described as a metaphor about the sufferer, martyr, and victim: “The sufferer is when a person without fault suffers. The martyr is when nonhumans torture a person. The victim is when the whips of injustice extinguish life. That is Goran’s metaphor. And his life.” His work is an example of anti-war poetry with messages against torture, mass murders and war crimes. "Jama" was studied in elementary schools throughout the Socialist Federal Republic of Yugoslavia.

"Jama"
The poem starts with a striking metaphor of blood replacing both light and darkness as victim's eyes were plucked out with a knife. That common torture was probably a mere sadism, since the victims were mass-murdered by Croatian Ustaše after that anyway:

Blood is my daylight and darkness too.
Blessing of night has been gouged from my cheeks
Bearing with it my more lucky sight.
Within those holes, for tears, fierce fire inflamedThe bleeding socket as if for brain a balm –
While my bright eyes died on my own palm

In culture

 Paul Éluard wrote a poem called The grave of Goran Kovačić.
 A Yugoslavian film Ivan Goran Kovačić, was made in 1979, written and directed by Ljubiša Ristić. Croatian actor Rade Šerbedžija portrayed Kovačić.
 The band Warnament recorded a song titled "Hollow Of The Innocent Victims" inspired by the poem "Jama"
 Branko Miljković's poem "Goran" is dedicated to Ivan Goran Kovačić.
 Dragutin Tadijanović's poem "Goran's Epitaph" (1945) is dedicated to Ivan Goran Kovačić.
 Živko Anočić portrayed the poet in Narodni heroj Ljiljan Vidić, receiving critical acclaim

References

1913 births
1943 deaths
People from Vrbovsko
People from the Kingdom of Croatia-Slavonia
Croatian Jews
Austro-Hungarian Jews
Croatian Austro-Hungarians
Croatian people of Romanian-Jewish descent
Yugoslav Partisans members
Croatian people of World War II
Jewish poets
Croatian writers
Yugoslav writers
Executed writers
Yugoslav military personnel killed in World War II
People killed by Chetniks during World War II
20th-century poets